David Archibald Cox (born September 23, 1948 in Washington, D.C.) is a retired American mathematician, working in algebraic geometry.

Cox graduated from Rice University with a bachelor's degree in 1970 and his Ph.D. in 1975 at Princeton University, under the supervision of Eric Friedlander (Tubular Neighborhoods in the Etale Topology). From 1974 to 1975, he was assistant professor at Haverford College and at Rutgers University from 1975 to 1979. In 1979, he became assistant professor and in 1988 professor at Amherst College.

He studies, among other things, étale homotopy theory, elliptic surfaces, computer-based algebraic geometry (such as Gröbner basis), Torelli sets and toric varieties, and history of mathematics. He is also known for several textbooks. He is a fellow of the American Mathematical Society.

From 1987 to 1988 he was a guest professor at Oklahoma State University. In 2012, he received the Lester Randolph Ford Award for Why Eisenstein Proved the Eisenstein Criterion and Why Schönemann Discovered It First.

Writings 
 With John Little, Donal O'Shea: Ideals, varieties, and algorithms: an introduction to computational algebraic geometry and commutative algebra, 3rd. edition, Springer Verlag 2007
  David A. Cox, John Little, and Donal O'Shea: Using algebraic geometry,  2nd. edition, Graduate Texts in Mathematics, vol. 185, Springer-Verlag, 2005. 
 With Sheldon Katz: Mirror Symmetry and Algebraic Geometry, American Mathematical Society 1999
 Galois Theory, Wiley/Interscience 2004
 With Bernd Sturmfels, Dinesh Manocha (eds.) Applications of computational algebraic geometry, American Mathematical Society 1998
 Primes of the form : Fermat, class field theory, and complex multiplication, Wiley 1989
 With John Little, Henry Schenck: Toric Varieties, American Mathematical Society 2011
 Contributions to Ernst Kunz Residues and duality for projective algebraic varieties, American Mathematical Society 2008

See also
Cox–Zucker machine
Cox ring

References

External links 
 Homepage
 

20th-century American mathematicians
21st-century American mathematicians
Fellows of the American Mathematical Society
1948 births
Living people
Mathematicians from Washington, D.C.
Rice University alumni
Princeton University alumni
Amherst College faculty
Algebraic geometers